The 2005 British Formula 3 International Series was the 55th British Formula 3 International Series season. It commenced on 2 April 2005 and ended on 9 October after twenty two races.

Drivers and teams
The following teams and drivers were competitors in the 2005 British Formula 3 International Series. The National class is for year-old Formula Three cars. Teams in the Invitation class are not series regulars, and do not compete for championship points.

Calendar and results
The Spa, Monza, Silverstone and Nürburgring races were held supporting the Le Mans Series. The remaining rounds supported the British GT Championship.

Notes:
1. – The Spa meeting was cancelled due to poor weather conditions. The meeting's races were run at Monza and the first Silverstone meeting.

Standings

Championship Class

References

External links
 The official website of the British Formula 3 Championship

British Formula Three Championship seasons
Formula Three season
British
British Formula 3 Championship